Radiocentrum is a genus of air-breathing land snails, terrestrial pulmonate gastropod mollusks in the family Oreohelicidae.

Species
Species within the genus Radiocentrum include:
 Radiocentrum avalonense (Hemphill, 1905) - Catalina mountain snail

References

Oreohelicidae
Taxonomy articles created by Polbot